Tenampúa is an archaeological site belonging to the Lenca culture dating from the early Mesoamerican classical period, located in central Honduras in the Comayagua valley. It is known for having the interesting characteristic of having several mounds of between 6 and 15 meters and a fortress inside, in addition to being a place located in a mountainous area with difficult access. The area is also characterized by being full of pine trees and a cool climate hovering between 15 and 21 degrees Celsius in temperature and strong gusts of wind.

Site description 
Located in the middle of a pine forest characteristic of central Honduras, 57 km from Tegucigalpa to the south of the municipality of the town of San Antonio, whose plateau is made up of sloping slopes that are difficult to access and 866 meters above the sea. From this space you can see part of the Comayagua valley, La Paz and the mountainous surroundings that adjoin the Francisco Morazán department, for this reason the Lenca decided to build the pre-Columbian fortification there. The 21-hectare area that comprises the archaeological site is made up of several mounds, platforms, and a fortress with walls of between two and four meters and whose base ranges from three to seven meters in which inside it houses stepped pyramidal structures of between 6 m and 12 m.

In the area there are also some bleachers, mounds that were once a characteristic ball court of Mesoamerican cultures, areas with rock engravings and rock art in nearby caves located in the same area. 250 structures haved been registered in the site, most of them covered by the vegetation. The site was the victim of constant looting for several decades, which meant that a good part of the infrastructure is currently deteriorated or incomplete due to the looting of some residents of the area, so it was registered as cultural heritage until 1997, it is currently protected by guards.

History 

The little that is known about this site is that it was built by the indigenous Lencas during the Mesoamerican early classical period with the purpose of being a ceremonial center and that it was also used as a refuge. It is not known precisely why it was abandoned or why the Lencas stopped using it as a ceremonial center to perform religious rituals, it may be that it was used more and more as a refuge and military fort during the constant wars they had during with different manors as evidenced by the remains of walls found on the site. The best explanation given by Honduran archaeologists for its abandonment would be that several villages that were located near the archaeological site were gradually abandoned by the inhabitants to settle more in lower areas, mainly in the valley, leaving a Tenampua in oblivion.

During the 19th century it was visited by the American explorer and archaeologist Ephraim George Squier in 1853, who sent reports and letters about the ruins to the New York community of historians. According to Squier's testimonies, the ruins came to amaze him not only because of their size but also because of the location in which they were built, since it was a feat of engineering to carry out the rocks to the mountainous terrain where they are located.

Some time later, the area encompassed by the archaeological site was also a victim of the Honduran civil war of 1924, which could considerably damaged the structures, which is why in some areas of it bullet caps and parts of bones of soldiers from the national army a few years after the war. According to the archaeologist Federico Lunardi at the time of visiting the ruins, they still had several lagoons and palaces that were still visible in 1948, which would suggest that the site also had recreation areas for the ruling elite and the priestly caste.

Currently it can be accessible to the public although it is quite difficult to access it as it is located in a mountainous and wooded area considerably away from inhabited areas although there are guides who are in charge of taking interested parties to

Findings 

Several researchers have found various types of ceramics with exquisite engravings and decorations, obsidian arrowheads, and jade carvings, have been found in the area, also statuettes representing some deities of the Lenca Mythology such as Itanipuca, Ilanguipuca, and Icelaca. Currently exhibited in museums in Comayagua and Tegucigalpa. Another finding are supposed temples near the area according to some North American researchers, although due to deterioration they are currently already collapsed or reduced to rubble covered by vegetation.

See also 

 Yarumela
 Copán
 Los Naranjos

References

External links 

 http://memoriacentroamericana.ihnca.edu.ni/index.php?id=251&tx_ttnews%5Btt_news%5D=1727&cHash=f5897af5f8055195153905b60ad9a384
 https://www.protectedplanet.net/ruinas-de-tenampua-cultural-monument

Mesoamerican sites
Comayagua Department
Archaeological sites in Honduras